The 1910 Nobel Prize in Literature was awarded to the German writer Paul Heyse (1830–1914) "as a tribute to the consummate artistry, permeated with idealism, which he has demonstrated during his long productive career as a lyric poet, dramatist, novelist and writer of world-renowned short stories." He is the third German recipient of the prize after Rudolf Christoph Eucken in 1908.

Laureate

Paul Heyse translated Italian poetry in addition to writing short tales, poems, novels, and plays. He belonged to Die Krokodile and Tunnel über der Spree, two literary organizations. Heyse's became better known as a writer of short stories with his famous works Der Jungbrunnen ("The Fountain of Youth", 1850) and L'Arrabiata ("The Fury", 1852), which is one of his most well-known novellas. The emphasis of Heyse's writings is on individuality and freedom.  He was dubbed Dichterfürst o prince of poetry, and he worked tirelessly to promote international understanding within Europe. His last published works were Letzten Novellen ("Recent Novellas") and Italienischen Volksmärchen ("Italian Folktales", 1914).

Deliberations

Nominations
Heyse had not been nominated for the prize before 1910, making it one of the rare occasions when an author have been awarded the Nobel Prize in Literature the same year they were first nominated. The nomination for Paul Heyse was made by a great number of professors and others in Munich, Berlin, Breslau, Halle, Leipzig and Vienna.

In total, the Nobel Committee of the Swedish Academy received 27 nominations for 25 individuals, among them Georg Brandes, Juhani Aho, and Ángel Guimerá. Twelve of the nominees were nominated first-time including Thomas Hardy, Andrew Lang, Robert Bridges, William Dean Howells, Alfred Fouillée, Gustav Warneck, Édouard Rod, Pierre Loti. Two of the nominees were women and both were also nominated first-time: American historian Molly Elliot Seawell and Austrian novelist Marie von Ebner-Eschenbach.

The authors Giuseppe Cesare Abba, Vittoria Aganoor, Otto Julius Bierbaum, Samuel Langhorne Clemens (known as Mark Twain), Frederick James Furnivall, Julia Ward Howe, William James, Emil Friedrich Kautzsch, Maria Konopnicka, William Vaughn Moody, George Panu, William Sydney Porter (known as O. Henry), Wilhelm Raabe, Jules Renard, Bertilda Samper Acosta, Florencio Sánchez, Catherine Helen Spence, and Toini Topelius died in 1910 without having been nominated for the prize. The Swiss novelist Édouard Rod died months before the announcement.

Reactions
The Nobel Prize to Paul Heyse did not receive much attention in his native Germany. Responses outside the German-speaking world were far more numerous. Particularly in Italy appreciations appeared in many publications, as well as notices in French newspapers such as Le Figaro.

Notes

References

External links
Award ceremony speech by C.D. af Wirsén nobelprize.org

1910